Jin Liqun (born August 1949) is a Chinese politician, banker, and professor. He is currently the President of the Asian Infrastructure Investment Bank (AIIB). He was formerly the Chairman of China International Capital Corporation, the Vice President of the Asian Development Bank, and the Vice Minister of Finance of the People's Republic of China.

Early life and education
Jin was born in Changshu, Jiangsu. He studied high school in Jiangyin but could not complete his education to bachelor's degree level because of the Cultural Revolution. As a teenager he briefly joined the Red Guards and from 1968 was sent to work in the countryside to grow rice. For three years he did this agricultural work and still continued to study by himself, which led to an appointment as teacher in a local middle school. In 1978 the universities reopened and he entered Beijing Foreign Studies University's Master program, graduating with a Master of Arts in English in 1980. He was later a Hubert Humphrey Fellow in the Economics Graduate Program at Boston University from 1987 to 1988. He is fluent in both English and French.

Career 
In 1980 Mr. Jin joined the Chinese Ministry of Finance office at the World Bank in Washington, D.C., later becoming Director General of the World Bank Department, and Alternative Executive Director of China to the World Bank Group. He became Vice Minister in 1998.  He was a member of the Monetary Policy Committee of the People’s Bank of China.

From 2003 to 2008, Jin was Vice President, and then Ranking Vice President, of the Asian Development Bank (ADB), in charge of programs for South, Central and West Asia, and private sector operations.

Jin was the Chairman of the Supervisory Board, China Investment Corporation, from September 2008 to May 2013.

From 2009 to 2012, Jin served first as Deputy Chairman, and subsequently as Chairman of the International Forum of Sovereign Wealth Funds.

Jin was then Chairman of China International Capital Corporation, a major Chinese investment banking firm based in Beijing from May 2013 to October 2014.

In October 2014 Jin became Secretary-General of the Multilateral Interim Secretariat established to create the AIIB. He became President-designate and in January 2016 he was elected as the President of the AIIB.

Jin is an adjunct professor and doctoral advisor at both Beijing Foreign Studies University and Nankai University.

Books 
Jin led the translation work of classic banking history The House of Morgan: An American Banking Dynasty and the Rise of Modern Finance and wrote Economic Development: Theories and Practices in collaboration with Nicholas Stern, then chief economist of the European Bank for Reconstruction and Development. Jin also published a book An Anthology of English Verse as an editor.

Personal life 
Jin has a daughter named Keyu Jin, who is now a tenured associate professor of Economics at London School of Economics and Political Science.

References 

1949 births
Beijing Foreign Studies University alumni
Boston University College of Arts and Sciences alumni
Businesspeople from Ningbo
Living people
People's Republic of China politicians from Zhejiang
Politicians from Ningbo
Asian Infrastructure Investment Bank people